The 2015 World Series of Poker is the 46th annual World Series of Poker (WSOP). It was held from May 27 – July 14 at the Rio All-Suite Hotel & Casino in Paradise, Nevada. There were 68 bracelet events, culminating in the $10,000 No Limit Hold'em Main Event, which began on July 5. The November Nine concept returned for an eighth year. Instead of a $10 million guaranteed first prize for the Main Event, however, there were now be 1,000 guaranteed payouts.

New tournament formats included the $565 Colossus No Limit Hold'em event, the lowest buy-in open event at the WSOP since the 1980 WSOP. The tournament featured four starting flights with a re-entry option for each flight and a $5,000,000 guaranteed prize pool. The $1,000 WSOP.com No Limit Hold'em event awarded the first WSOP bracelet in an online tournament, with the final six players playing at the Rio on July 4. A bounty tournament was also featured, with a player earning $500 for each elimination. A Super Seniors event was also added, open to players 65 or older. In addition to these new formats, the structure for lower buy-in events was also altered and featured five times the buy-in for a starting stack.

Event schedule
Source:

Player of the Year
Final standings as of October 24 (end of WSOPE):

Main Event
The $10,000 No Limit Hold'em Main Event began on July 5 with the first of three starting flights. The November Nine was reached on July 14, with the finalists returning on November 8. The final table was played over three days. The first day played down to the final six players, the second was played down to three players, and finally the bracelet was awarded on November 10.

The Main Event drew 6,420 players, creating a prize pool of $60,348,000. The top 1,000 players finished in the money. Each player at the final table earned over $1,000,000, with first place being $7,683,346.

Performance of past champions

 * Indicates the place of a player who finished in the money

Other notable high finishes
NB: This list is restricted to top 30 finishers with an existing Wikipedia entry.

November Nine
*Career statistics prior to the beginning of the 2015 Main Event.

Final Table

Records
The $565 Colossus No Limit Hold'em event established a new record for largest field in a WSOP event, attracting 22,374 entrants. The previous record was set in the 2006 Main Event with 8,773. The event also set a new record as the largest live poker tournament.

With his victory in the $10,000 Limit 2-7 Triple Draw Lowball Championship, Tuan Le became the first player to win the same $10,000 buy-in event in consecutive years since Johnny Chan won the Main Event in 1988. Counting all buy-in amounts, he is the first to accomplish this feat since Thang Luu won his second consecutive $1,500 Omaha Hi-Low Split-8 or Better event in 2009.

References

External links
Official site

World Series of Poker
World Series of Poker
World Series of Poker